Tan Biónica is a pop rock band from Argentina. The group was formed in 2002 in Buenos Aires by vocalist Santiago "Chano" Moreno Charpentier, his younger brother Gonzalo "Bambi" Moreno Charpentier, Sebastián Seoane (guitar), and Diego Lichtenstein (drums). Tan Biónica worked on the soundtracks for the telenovelas Graduados and Viudas e hijos del Rock and Roll.

Tan Biónica enjoyed significant radio airplay and fame after the release of their second studio album, Obsesionario, in 2010. Their next album, Destinología in 2013, contained the single Ciudad Mágica, which reached the Number 1 spot on the Argentina Top 20 chart. Destinología also featured the band's second Number 1 hit single, La Melodía de Dios. The band broke up in 2016 but their lead vocalist Chano announced on 17 March 2023 that all the original members would be returning for a second term.

Members
 Bambi Moreno Charpentier: bass and synth 
 Chano Moreno Charpentier: singer
 Diego Lichtenstein: drums
 Sebastián Seoane: guitars

Awards

2013: Winner of "Best Latin Song" during the Kids Choice Awards Argentina awards
2013: Winner of "Best Argentinian artist" during E! Awards
2014: Winner of "Best Album - Pop Groups" during Premios Gardel awards
2012: Nominee of "Best South Latin American Act" during MTV EMA 
2013: Nominee of "Best South Latin American Act" during MTV EMA
2014: Nominee of "Best South Latin American Act" during MTV EMA
2015: Nominee of "Best South Latin American Act" during MTV EMA

Discography

Albums
2001: Tapa de Moda (demo)
2007: Canciones del huracán
2010: Obsesionario
2013: Destinología
2015: Hola mundo

Special releases
2014: Obsesionario (Black edition)
2014: Destinologia (Black Edition)

Live albums
2014: Vivo Usina del Arte

Remix albums
2015: Hola mi vida (The Remixes)
2016: Buenas noches otra vez (The Remixes)

EP
2003: Wonderful Noches

Singles

References

Argentine pop music groups
Argentine rock music groups
Musical groups from Buenos Aires
Musical groups established in 2002